Modern Pop Classics is a 1980 split single featuring the songs "I'm Sticking With You" by Maureen Tucker & Friends and "Of Yesterday" by Count Viglione & Lady Carolyn.

Track listing
Side 1: "I'm Sticking With You" – 2:13
Side 2: "Of Yesterday" – 2:45

Personnel
Side One
Maureen Tucker – vocals
Jonathan Richman – vocals
Willie Alexander – keyboards, backing vocals
George Nardo – guitar
Walter Powers – bass
Jim Wilkin – drums

References

Maureen Tucker albums
1980 singles